Olivier Guillon (born 22 May 1972) is a French equestrian who competes in the sport of show jumping. 

At the 2012 Summer Olympics in London, Guillon was a member of the French team in the team jumping competition which finished in twelfth place.

References 

1972 births
Living people
Equestrians at the 2012 Summer Olympics
French show jumping riders
Olympic equestrians of France
French male equestrians
Mediterranean Games silver medalists for France
Mediterranean Games medalists in equestrian
Competitors at the 2005 Mediterranean Games
21st-century French people